WMTM-FM (93.9 FM, "Cruisin' 94") is a radio station broadcasting a classic hits music format. Licensed to Moultrie, Georgia, United States.  The station is currently owned by Colquitt Broadcasting Company, LLC.

References

External links

MTM-FM
Classic hits radio stations in the United States
Radio stations established in 1967